The Bishop of Swansea and Brecon is the Ordinary of the Church in Wales Diocese of Swansea and Brecon.

The diocese covers the City and County of Swansea and the ancient counties of Brecknockshire and Radnorshire. The diocesan cathedral is the Cathedral Church of Saint John the Evangelist in the town of Brecon, which has been a parish church since the Reformation, becoming elevated to cathedral status in 1923. The diocese is administered from Brecon, with an additional office in Swansea.

The Bishop's residence is Ely Tower, Brecon. The office was created in 1923 at the founding of the diocese, an area stretching south to the coast of Gower and north into much of mid-Wales. Immediately prior to the diocese's erection, the first bishop, Edward Bevan, had served as Bishop of Swansea, a suffragan in the Diocese of St Davids.

It was announced on 4 November 2021 that John Lomas, Archdeacon of Wrexham had been appointed as the 10th Bishop of Swansea and Brecon. His election was confirmed at a Sacred Synod in Wrexham on 22 November 2021.

List of the Bishops of the Diocese of Swansea and Brecon

Notes

Sources
 Whitaker's Almanack to 2004, Joseph Whitaker and Sons Ltd/A&C Black, London

Swansea
 
Bishop of Swansea and Brecon
Swansea
Lists of people by city in Wales

cy:Abertawe ac Aberhonddu